Gouri may refer to:

People
 Gouri Chindarkar (born 1996), involved in the Self Organised Learning Environment
 Gouri Choudhury (born 1964), Bangladeshi singer and music teacher
 Gouri Dharmapal, Indian poet
 Gouri Sankar Bandyopadhyay (born 1962), Indian researcher
 Gouri Sankar Dutta, Indian Politician
 Haim Gouri (1923–2018), Israeli poet, novelist, journalist, and documentary filmmaker
 Juloori Gouri Shankar, Indian writer
 Gourang Kavugoli Most Wanted Criminal

Places
 Gouri, Burkina Faso